Maysville is a town in Garvin and McClain counties, Oklahoma, United States. The population was 1,232 at the 2010 census, down from 1,313 in 2000.

History
A post office was established at this location on March 19, 1878 and operated until May 29, 1878.  It was reestablished as Beef Creek, Indian Territory on June 17, 1878.  The post office took its name from nearby Beef Creek, a tributary of the Washita River.

On September 19, 1902, after the town had relocated a mile north to be alongside the tracks of the newly-laid Kiowa, Chickasha and Fort Smith Railway (an affiliate of the Atchison, Topeka and Santa Fe Railway), and the post office joined it, the name was changed to Maysville.  The new name was in honor of David Mayes and John Mayes, local ranchers.

At the time of its founding, Beef Creek, later Mayesville, was located in Pickens County, Chickasaw Nation.

Geography
Maysville is located in northern Garvin County at  (34.817489, -97.410162), on the south side of the valley of the Washita River. The town has an exclave to the north in McClain County, surrounding Wiley Post Memorial Reservoir.

Oklahoma State Highway 19 passes through the center of town as 6th Street, leading southeast  to Pauls Valley, the Garvin County seat, and west  to Lindsay. State Highway 74 (Ripley Street) crosses Highway 19 on the east side of downtown, leading north  to Purcell and south  to Elmore City.

Demographics

As of the census of 2000, there were 1,313 people, 507 households, and 317 families residing in the town. There were 581 housing units at an average density of 1,031.0 per square mile (400.6/km2). The racial makeup of the town was 85.00% White, 0.38% African American, 9.60% Native American, 0.15% Pacific Islander, 0.76% from other races, and 4.11% from two or more races. Hispanic or Latino of any race were 1.68% of the population.

There were 507 households, out of which 32.7% had children under the age of 18 living with them, 53.1% were married couples living together, 13.8% had a female householder with no husband present, and 29.4% were non-families. 26.8% of all households were made up of individuals, and 13.0% had someone living alone who was 65 years of age or older. The average household size was 2.53 and the average family size was 3.05.

In the town, the population was spread out, with 28.5% under the age of 18, 8.1% from 18 to 24, 24.2% from 25 to 44, 20.6% from 45 to 64, and 18.7% who were 65 years of age or older. The median age was 37 years. For every 100 females, there were 86.8 males. For every 100 females age 18 and over, there were 82.0 males.

The median income for a household in the town was $25,921, and the median income for a family was $31,369. Males had a median income of $28,194 versus $18,438 for females. The per capita income for the town was $12,449. About 16.9% of families and 21.6% of the population were below the poverty line, including 24.0% of those under age 18 and 16.1% of those age 65 or over.

In fiction
In the fifth season of The West Wing, an Oklahoma town named Maysville was the site of a devastating tornado.

References

Towns in Garvin County, Oklahoma
Towns in Oklahoma